Krishna Kumari may refer to:

 Krishna Kumari (princess) (1794–1810), princess of Udaipur princely state of India
 Krishna Kumari (regent) (1926–2018), last reigning Maharani of Marwar-Jodhpur
 Krishna Kumari (actress) (1933–2018), Telugu actress of the 1960s and 1970s
 Krishna Kumari (politician) (1908–1962), politician and Rajya Sabha member from Madhya Pradesh
 Krishna Kumari Kohli, Pakistani politician and member of the Senate of Pakistan
 Krishna Kumari (born 1934), Hindi actress of 1950s and 1960s who acted in many films including Nagin